Gajabahu synchronism is the chronological device used by historians to help date early Tamil history.  The synchronism, first propounded by V. Kanakasabhai Pillai in 1904 in his The Tamils Eighteen Hundred Years ago, was adopted by some scholars of the time to date Tamil literature.  Kamil Zvelebil, even while acknowledging the fragility of the synchronism, called it the "sheet anchor" of the dating of Tamil literature.  The synchronism however, involves numerous conjectures and has been dismissed by Gananath Obeyesekere in his The Cult of the Goddess Pattini (1984) as ahistorical and invalid.

The 'synchronism'
From a mention in the Silappatikaram, the Sinhalese  king of Lanka, Gajabahu is taken to be a contemporary of the Chera king Senguttuvan. The genuineness of Gajabahu synchronism as an instrument to date early Tamil literature is accepted by most scholars today.

Dating of Senguttuvan

In the Silappatikaram, there is reference to a certain Kayavaku, the king of Sri Lanka. He is said to have attended the coronation of the Chera king Senguttuvan.

The 30th Canto, 160, in translation, reads -
The monarch of the world circumambulated the shrine thrice and stood there proffering his respects.  In front of him the Arya kings released from prison, kings removed from central jail, the Kongu ruler of Kudagu, the king of Malva and Kayavaku, the king of sea-girt Ceylon, prayed reverently to the deity thus...
Kayavaku here, despite some disagreement has been conjectured to mean Gajabahu.  The Silappatikaram, therefore is read to imply that, Gajabahu was a contemporary of the Chera king Senguttuvan, the protagonist of the epic. Sri Lankan history, however records the reign of two Gajabahus. According to the Mahavamsa, Gajabahu I reigned between 113 - 134 CE, while Gajabahu II reigned in the 12th century CE.

Kanakasabhai's reasoning for not considering Gajabahu II as the king mentioned is as follows: 
In the long list of kings of Sri Lanka preserved in Singhalese chronicles, the name Gajabahu occurs only twice. Gajabahu I lived in the early part of the second century A.D. and Gajabahu II in the twelfth century.  If the latter was king referred to in the Cilappathikaram, Karikala Chola, the grandfather of the Gajabahu contemporary, Imaya Varamban should have lived in the eleventh or twelfth century A.D.  But in many Tamil poems and inscriptions on copper plates recording the grants of Chola kings who lived in the tenth and the eleventh centuries, Karikala Chola I is described as one of the earliest and most remote ancestors of the Chola kings then reigning.  It is evident therefore that the Gajabahu referred to in the Cilappathikaram could not be Gajabahu II, but must have been Gajabahu I, who was king of Ceylon from about A.D. 113 to A.D. 125.

This, in turn, has been used to imply that the Chera king kuttuvan, who, according to the Pathirruppaththu ruled for 55 years may be dated to c. 110 - 165 CE.  This computation, which was first proposed by V Kanakasabhai Pillai in his book, The Tamils 1800 years ago (1904), has come to be known as the Gajabahu synchronism. Kanakasabhai also mentions another reference from Silappatikaram which has the Chera king meet the Magadha king Nurruvan Kannar who is interpreted to as Satakarni, which was a common among the Satavahana and Andhra dynasties as an additional proof for the synchronism.

Scholar Tieken criticizes this synchronism as of circular logic.

References

Tamil-language literature